The 2010–11 QMJHL season was the 42nd season of the Quebec Major Junior Hockey League (QMJHL). The regular season, which consisted of eighteen teams playing 68 games each, began on September 9, 2010 and ended on March 20, 2011. The playoffs featured 16 teams chasing the President's Cup, beginning on March 24, 2011, and ending with the Saint John Sea Dogs capturing the title on May 15, 2011.

Regular season

Division standings

x – team has clinched playoff spot

y – team is division leader

z – team has clinched division

Scoring leadersNote: GP = Games played; G = Goals; A = Assists; Pts = Points; PIM = Penalty minutesLeading goaltendersNote: GP = Games played; TOI = Total ice time; W = Wins; L = Losses ; GA = Goals against; SO = Total shutouts; SV% = Save percentage; GAA = Goals against average Playoffs 

First round

(1) Saint John Sea Dogs vs. (16) Cape Breton Screaming Eagles
 

(2) Montreal Junior Hockey Club vs. (15) Halifax Mooseheads
 

(3) Quebec Remparts vs. (14) Val-d'Or Foreurs

(4) Drummondville Voltigeurs vs. (13) Chicoutimi Saguenéens

(5) Gatineau Olympiques vs. (12) Rimouski Océanic

(6) Acadie-Bathurst Titan vs. (11) Victoriaville Tigres

(7) Shawinigan Cataractes vs. (10) P.E.I. Rocket

(8) Lewiston MAINEiacs vs. (9) Moncton Wildcats

Quarter-finals

(1) Saint John Sea Dogs vs. (11) Victoriaville Tigres
 

(2) Montreal Junior Hockey Club vs. (8) Lewiston MAINEiacs

(3) Quebec Remparts vs. (7) Shawinigan Cataractes

(4) Drummondville Voltigeurs vs. (5) Gatineau Olympiques

 Semi-finals 

(1) Saint John Sea Dogs vs. (8) Lewiston MAINEiacs

(3) Quebec Remparts vs. (5) Gatineau Olympiques

QMJHL Championship

(1) Saint John Sea Dogs vs. (5) Gatineau Olympiques

Playoff scoring leadersNote: GP = Games played; G = Goals; A = Assists; Pts = Points; PIM = Penalty minutesPlayoff leading goaltendersNote: GP = Games played; Mins = Minutes played; W = Wins; L = Losses; GA = Goals Allowed; SO = Shutouts; SV& = Save percentage; GAA = Goals against average''

Memorial Cup

Trophies and awards
Team
President's Cup: Saint John Sea Dogs
Jean Rougeau Trophy – Regular Season Champions: Saint John Sea Dogs
Luc Robitaille Trophy – Team that scored the most goals: Saint John Sea Dogs
Robert Lebel Trophy – Team with best GAA: Saint John Sea Dogs

Player
Michel Brière Memorial Trophy – Most Valuable Player: Sean Couturier, Drummondville Voltigeurs
Jean Béliveau Trophy – Top Scorer: Philip-Michael Devos, Gatineau Olympiques / Victoriaville Tigres
Guy Lafleur Trophy – Playoff MVP: Jonathan Huberdeau, Saint John Sea Dogs
Jacques Plante Memorial Trophy – Top Goaltender: Jacob De Serres, Saint John Sea Dogs
Guy Carbonneau Trophy – Best Defensive Forward: Phillip Danault, Victoriaville Tigres
Emile Bouchard Trophy – Defenceman of the Year: Simon Després, Saint John Sea Dogs
Kevin Lowe Trophy – Best Defensive Defenceman: Andrew Randazzo, Drummondville Voltigeurs
Mike Bossy Trophy – Top Prospect: Sean Couturier, Drummondville Voltigeurs
RDS Cup – Rookie of the Year: Charles Hudon, Chicoutimi Saguenéens
Michel Bergeron Trophy – Offensive Rookie of the Year: Charles Hudon, Chicoutimi Saguenéens
Raymond Lagacé Trophy – Defensive Rookie of the Year: Domenic Graham, Drummondville Voltigeurs
Frank J. Selke Memorial Trophy – Most sportsmanlike player: Philip-Michael Devos, Gatineau Olympiques / Victoriaville Tigres
QMJHL Humanitarian of the Year – Humanitarian of the Year: Gabriel Lemieux, Shawinigan Cataractes
Marcel Robert Trophy – Best Scholastic Player: Nicolas Therrien, Chicoutimi Saguenéens
Paul Dumont Trophy – Personality of the Year: Louis Leblanc, Montreal Junior Hockey Club

Executive
Ron Lapointe Trophy – Coach of the Year: Gerard Gallant – Saint John Sea Dogs
Maurice Filion Trophy – General Manager of the Year: Mike Kelly – Saint John Sea Dogs
John Horman Trophy – Executive of the Year: Wayne Long – Saint John Sea Dogs
Jean Sawyer Trophy – Marketing Director of the Year: Lucie Cloutier & Yves Cinq-Mars – Quebec Remparts

See also
 2011 Memorial Cup
 List of QMJHL seasons
 2010–11 OHL season
 2010–11 WHL season
 2010 in ice hockey
 2011 in ice hockey

References

External links
 Official QMJHL website
 Official CHL website
 Official website of the Subway Super Series

Quebec Major Junior Hockey League seasons
QMJHL